Sachiko Kato (born 19 February 2000) is a Japanese rugby union player. She plays Prop for Japan and for Exeter Chiefs in the Premier 15s.

Biography 
Kato made her international debut for Japan against Hong Kong when she was 17 years old. In 2021, She was named in Japan's squad for their European tour. She featured in all three test matches against Wales, Scotland and Ireland. She scored a try in their 36–12 loss to Scotland.

Kato was named in the Sakura fifteens squad for their Australian tour in 2022. She was later selected in Japan's squad for the 2021 Rugby World Cup in New Zealand.

References

External links 

 Exeter Chiefs Profile

2000 births
Living people
Japanese female international rugby union players